Ambon flying fox or Ambon flying-fox can refer to two species of bats:
Pteropus argentatus
Pteropus chrysoproctus

Animal common name disambiguation pages